The Danish Union of Librarians (BF) is a trade union in Denmark. It has a membership of 5500, and is affiliated with the Danish Confederation of Professional Associations.

External links
 

Akademikerne – The Danish Confederation of Professional Associations
Trade unions in Denmark